The men's eight event was part of the rowing programme at the 1920 Summer Olympics. The competition was held on 28 and 29 August 1920. It was the fifth appearance of the event. Eight boats (72 competitors), each from a different nation, competed. It was the first time that nations were limited to a single boat. The event was won by the United States in a final against Great Britain; the two nations had taken all four previous gold medals (the United States winning in 1900 and 1904, when Great Britain did not compete; Great Britain winning in 1908 and 1912, when the United States did not compete). Bronze went to Norway, the nation's first medal in the men's eight. In addition to gold medals, the winners received a challenge prize that had been donated by Eugenio Brunetta d'Usseaux before his death in 1919.

Background

This was the fifth appearance of the event. Rowing had been on the programme in 1896 but was cancelled due to bad weather. The men's eight has been held every time that rowing has been contested, beginning in 1900.

The two-time defending Olympic champion was the Leander Club of Great Britain. The United States had won the previous two Games, both times represented by the Vesper Boat Club; in 1920, the American squad came from the United States Naval Academy. The two teams were favoured at the 1920 Games. Another contender was Switzerland, the 1920 European Rowing Championships winners.

Czechoslovakia and Switzerland each made their debut in the event. Belgium, France, Great Britain, Norway, and the United States each made their third appearance, tying the absent Canada for most among nations to that point.

Competition format

The "eight" event featured nine-person boats, with eight rowers and a coxswain. It was a sweep rowing event, with the rowers each having one oar (and thus each rowing on one side). The course used the 2000 metres distance that became the Olympic standard in 1912.

The 1920 tournament featured three rounds of one-on-one races; with 8 boats in the competition, the bracket was perfectly balanced. There were 4 quarterfinals, 2 semifinals, and a final.

Schedule

Results

Quarterfinals

Quarterfinal 1

Quarterfinal 2

Quarterfinal 3

Quarterfinal 4

Semifinals

Semifinal 1

Semifinal 2

Final

References

External links
 
 

Rowing at the 1920 Summer Olympics